Margaret Henrietta Augusta Casely-Hayford CBE (born 1959) is a British lawyer, businesswoman and public figure who is active in the voluntary sector. She is Chancellor of Coventry University, chairs the board of trustees of Shakespeare's Globe, and was formerly chair of ActionAid UK and company secretary and head of legal services for leading retailers the John Lewis Partnership.
She is in the forefront of working to create diversity on boards.

Biography
Margaret Casely-Hayford was born in London, England, into the prominent Ghanaian Casely-Hayford family: the daughter of Victor Casely-Hayford, an accountant who had trained as a barrister, her grandfather was the Gold Coast lawyer, writer and politician J. E. Casely Hayford, and her brothers are historian Gus Casely-Hayford, designer Joe Casely-Hayford and Peter Casely-Hayford, formerly managing director of TV production company Twenty Twenty. In 2008, the Casely-Hayfords were named on "The Black Powerlist" as the most influential black family in the UK.

Casely-Hayford studied law at Somerville College, Oxford, graduating in 1982, and did her Bar finals at the Inns of Court School of Law, being called to the Bar in 1983 (Gray's Inn). She worked for 20 years with the law firm Dentons, where she was made a Partner, becoming the first black woman to hold such a position in a City firm. She specialised in planning matters, and in 1995 wrote a book, Practical Planning: Permission and the Application . From 2000 to 2008 she was a government-appointed trustee of Great Ormond Street Children's Hospital Charity and of the Geffrye Museum and was on the development board of the Young Vic theatre. During 2012–16 she was a non-executive director of NHS England, and on the Board of the British Retail Consortium. She also serves on the Metropolitan Police panel overseeing the investigation into police corruption. She is in the forefront of working to create diversity on boards.

For nine years, until 2014, she was Director of Legal Services and Company Secretary for the John Lewis Partnership. She was also on the Board of the British Retail Consortium for four years to 2014.

She became Chair of the charity ActionAid UK in 2014, and in 2016 she became a member-nominated Director of The Co-op. She is an ambassador of Board Apprentice and Chairs the advisory board of Ultra Education, working to develop young entrepreneurs, and a non-executive director of WetZebra Media. She is also a trustee of The Radcliffe Trust, one of Britain's oldest charities supporting classical music performance and training,

She chaired the diversity review conducted by CILIP in 2017 into the awarding of the Carnegie and Kate Greenaway Medals. Committed to encouraging all business leaders to promote diversity on boards, she has said: "That is the future. There is a whole slew of people who still feel that they aren't part of the game. We are a mixed society – that's what Britain has been for so long. We just need to be more positive rather than negative, and showcase it. We are now at a crossroads."

Additionally, she is the former mentor of rap artist and media entrepreneur Kelvyn Colt.

In July 2017, Casely-Hayford was named the new Chancellor of Coventry University, the first woman to hold the position. She was appointed for a second term in 2020.

In February 2018, she was announced as the new chair of the board of Shakespeare's Globe, taking over the appointment from Michael Bichard.

Awards and recognition
In 2014 she was voted Black British Business Person of the Year at the Black British Business Awards (BBBA) founded by Melanie Eusebe.

In 2016 Casely-Hayford was awarded an honorary doctorate by Middlesex University.

She was appointed a Commander of the Order of the British Empire (CBE) in the 2018 Birthday Honours, for charitable services in the UK and abroad.

In October 2019, it was announced that Casely-Hayford would be featured in the 2020 Powerlist as one of the 100 most influential black people in the United Kingdom. The following year, Casely-Hayford was included in the 2021 edition of the Powerlist, for her contributions to the education sector.

In 2020, she was elected an Honorary Fellow of Somerville College, Oxford.

In 2021, Casely-Hayford was elected a Master of the Bench at Gray's Inn.

References

External links
 
 "Inspirational Woman: Margaret Casely-Hayford CBE | Chancellor, Coventry University", We Are the City, 13 August 2020.

Living people
1959 births
21st-century British businesswomen
Alumni of Somerville College, Oxford
Alumni of the Inns of Court School of Law
Black British lawyers
British women lawyers
Commanders of the Order of the British Empire
English people of Ghanaian descent
Fante people
Fellows of Somerville College, Oxford
Ghanaian people of English descent
Ghanaian people of Irish descent
People associated with Coventry University
Margaret